Raymond David Grant, 11th Baron de Longueuil (1924 – 6 October 2004) was a nobleman possessing the only French colonial title to be officially recognized by the British Crown. For much of his life, he was a professional painter residing in France.

Family
He was the son of Ronald Charles Grant and Ernestine Bowes-Lyon.  His mother was a first cousin to the Queen Mother.  The 11th Baron was therefore a second cousin to Queen Elizabeth II.

Raymond had one son, Michael Charles Grant (who inherited his title), and four grandchildren: Angela, Rachel, Rebecca and David.

School and military
He attended schools in Pau, and then Elizabeth College in Guernsey. With the outbreak of World War II, he came to Britain where he volunteered and became a Lieutenant in 1943.  After the war, he returned to school, this time in Nottingham, England. He later went to Cambridge, England to study art, at first full-time and later in the evenings between his employment in the Cambridge-area blood transfusion services.

Life's work
In 1953, he returned to Navarrenx in the South of France near the Pyrenees. He began his professional career as an artist, constantly entering competitions, exhibiting, and later permanent exhibitions in the town. He developed and matured distinctive styles, seeking the company of regional artists and accepting criticism. He spent most of his life as an artist, painting under the name of "Raymond de Longueuil", capturing the final years of traditional farming in the Bearn. His subjects ranged from the figurative, through still life and landscape to the abstract, and he had a constant need to develop and experiment. A deeply religious man, he was almost reclusive and fanatical about his creativity - characteristics which flowed into his art, diaries, and poetry.

This was not a life of privilege but of challenge. From both outside and inside, he was obsessed by creativity. Elements from his deep faith were frequently reflected in subtle motifs. Prior to his death in 2004, he had been working until two days before on a woodland scene, sketched out on his easel in his bedroom. Next to this was his light-box and an outline for a monoprint of The Shepherd leading his flock through mountains.

Legacy
He died in Navarrenx, France in 2004.

The Institute Raymond de Longueuil opened in Navarrenx in 2007.  It houses a selection of his works and is intended to serve as a local place of interest for travellers and artists.

June 2008 marked the official inauguration of "Passage Raymond de Longueuil l" - the naming of an old, historic street at the king's lieutenant's grounds in the centre of Navarrenx, in remembrance of the acclaimed local artist. Included in the unveiling was an exhibition opening of unique works by Raymond de Longueuil held at the former residence of the king's lieutenant.

Ancestry

References

External links
 Official website of Baron Raymond De Longueuil
 Website for Raymond De Longueuil

recognized by the Crown in right of Canada

1924 births
2004 deaths
Barons of Longueuil
Le Moyne family
French expatriates in the United Kingdom